Thierry Pauwels (born 22 July 1957, Ghent) is a Belgian astronomer from the Royal Observatory of Belgium. Between 1996 and 2008 he discovered and co-discovered 146 minor planets. This makes him one of the top 100 minor planet discoverers.

The main-belt asteroid 12761 Pauwels, discovered by his colleague Eric Elst at La Silla Observatory in 1993, was named after him in 1993. Naming citation was published on 18 March 2003.

List of discovered minor planets

References 
 

1957 births
20th-century Belgian astronomers
Discoverers of asteroids

Living people
21st-century Belgian astronomers